Iridium Communications Inc. (formerly Iridium Satellite LLC) is a publicly traded American company headquartered in McLean, Virginia. Iridium operates the Iridium satellite constellation, a system of 66 active satellites and nine in-orbit spares used for worldwide voice and data communication from handheld satellite phones, satellite messenger communication devices and integrated transceivers, as well as for two-way satellite messaging service from supported Android smartphones. The nearly polar orbit and communication between satellites via inter-satellite links provide global service availability.

History 
The Iridium communications service was launched on November 1, 1998, formerly known as Iridium SSC. The first Iridium call was made by Vice President of the United States Al Gore to Gilbert Grosvenor, the great-grandson of Alexander Graham Bell and chairman of the National Geographic Society. Motorola provided the technology and major financial backing. The logo of the company represents the Big Dipper. The company derives its name from the chemical element iridium, which has an atomic number of 77, equaling the initial number of satellites which were planned to be deployed.

On August 13, 1999, nine months after the launch of the organization, the founding company went into Chapter 11 bankruptcy. The handsets could not operate as promoted until the entire constellation of satellites was in place, requiring a massive initial capital cost of billions of dollars. The cost of service dissuaded many potential users. Reception indoors was difficult and the hand held devices, when compared to terrestrial cellular mobile phones were bulkier and more expensive, both of which discouraged adoption among potential users.

Mismanagement is another major factor cited in the original program's failure. In 1999, CNN writer David Rohde detailed how he applied for Iridium service and was sent information kits, but was never contacted by a sales representative. He encountered programming problems on Iridium's website, and a "run-around" from the company's representatives. After Iridium filed bankruptcy, it cited "difficulty gaining subscribers."

The initial commercial failure of Iridium had a damping effect on other proposed commercial satellite constellation projects, including Teledesic. Other schemes (Orbcomm, ICO Global Communications, and Globalstar) followed Iridium into bankruptcy protection, while a number of other proposed schemes were never constructed.

In August 2000, Motorola announced that the Iridium satellites would have to be deorbited; however, they remained in orbit and operational. In December 2000, the US government stepped in to save Iridium by providing US$72 million in exchange for a two-year contract and approving the fire-sale of the company from US bankruptcy court for $25 million, in March 2001. This erased over $4 billion in debt.

Iridium service was restarted in 2001 by the newly founded Iridium Satellite LLC, which was owned by a group of private investors.

On February 10, 2009, Iridium 33 collided with a defunct Russian satellite, Kosmos 2251,  over Siberia. Two large debris clouds were created.

Iridium NEXT launch campaign 

Iridium replaced its original constellation by sending 75 new Iridium satellites into space on SpaceX Falcon 9 rockets. The campaign also consisted of upgrades to Iridium ground infrastructure.

The Iridium NEXT launch campaign was announced in 2007. Within three years, Iridium completed financing and began work on launching new satellites. In June 2010, Iridium announced a fixed-price contract with Thales Alenia Space for the design and construction of the next-generation satellites for the upgraded constellation. Two weeks later, Iridium announced a $492 million contract designating the Falcon 9 as a major provider of launch services for the Iridium NEXT campaign, becoming the largest single commercial launch deal ever signed (simultaneously representing a benchmark in cost-effective satellite delivery to space).

On January 14, 2017, 10 years after the campaign was first announced, the first of eight Iridium NEXT launches took place with SpaceX from Vandenberg Air Force Base in California. Over the next two years, Iridium sent an additional 65 satellites into low Earth orbit to completely replace the original satellite constellation. The final Iridium NEXT launch took place on January 11, 2019, less than two years after the first launch.

The Iridium NEXT network covers the entire Earth, including poles, oceans and airways, with 66 satellites, with the remaining nine acting as active backups, for a total of 75 launched. Six remain on the ground as spares for a total of 81 built.

Present status 
Iridium Satellite LLC merged with a special-purpose acquisition company (GHQ) created by the investment bank Greenhill & Co. in September 2009 to create Iridium Communications Inc. The public company trades on NASDAQ under the symbol "IRDM". The company surpassed one million subscribers in March 2018. Revenue for the full year 2018 was $523.0 million with operational EBITDA of $302.0 million, a 14% increase from $265.6 million in the prior year.

Iridium manages several operations centers, including Tempe, Arizona and Leesburg, Virginia, United States.

The system is being used by the U.S. Department of Defense.

Matt Desch is the CEO of Iridium LLC.

Hosted Payload Alliance 
Iridium is a founding member of the Hosted Payload Alliance (HPA), a satellite industry alliance program. Membership in the HPA is open to satellite operators, satellite manufacturers, system integrators, and other interested parties.

Air safety communications 
In July 2011, the Federal Aviation Administration (FAA) issued a ruling that approves the use of Iridium for Future Air Navigation System (FANS) data links, enabling satellite data links with air-traffic control for aircraft flying in the FANS environment, including areas not served by Inmarsat (above or below 70 degrees latitude) which includes polar routes.

Global Maritime Distress and Safety System 
In January 2020, the Iridium constellation was certified for use in the Global Maritime Distress and Safety System (GMDSS). The certification ended a monopoly on the provision of maritime distress services that had previously been held by Inmarsat since the system became operational in 1999.

Iridium satellite constellation 

The Iridium system requires 66 active satellites in low Earth orbit to complete its constellation and 9 spare satellites are kept in-orbit to serve in case of failure. Satellites communicate with neighboring satellites via Ka band intersatellite links to relay communications to and from ground stations. The original constellation was launched in the late 1990s before the company went through bankruptcy. In January 2017, Iridium began to launch its next-generation satellites through its $3 billion launch campaign, Iridium NEXT. The new satellites were sent into space on SpaceX Falcon 9 launch vehicles from Vandenberg AFB Space Launch Complex 4 in California over the course of eight launches between January 2017 and January 2019. On January 14, 2017, SpaceX launched 10 of the new Iridium satellites into orbit. The second launch of Iridium NEXT satellites took place on June 25, 2017 on a SpaceX Falcon 9 rocket out of Vandenberg Air Force Base. This was the second of eight scheduled launches. The third launch of 10 NEXT satellites took place on October 9, 2017. On December 22, 2017, ten additional satellites were deployed after a successful launch on a SpaceX Falcon 9 rocket. On May 22, SpaceX successfully launched an additional five Iridium NEXT satellites from Vandenberg Air Force Base.

On January 11, 2019, the final ten satellites were placed in orbit by SpaceX.

Subscriber equipment

Handsets 
Iridium offers four satellite handsets: the 9555, 9575A (which is only available to US government customers), the Extreme, and the Extreme PTT.

Wi-Fi Hotspots 
In 2014, Iridium began to offer the Iridium Go! hotspot, which can also be used as a distress beacon under certain circumstances. As of September 2020, Iridium's manufacturing contractor, Beam Communications, had built 50,000 of these devices.

One-way pagers 
Two pagers were made for the Iridium network – the Motorola 9501 and Kyocera SP-66K. These are one-way devices that could receive messages sent in the form of SMS.

Messages are delivered to pre-selected "MDAs" which cover a certain geographic area. Three of these MDAs may be selected on a web-based portal or updated automatically if the paging service is bound to an Iridium phone. Each country has its own MDA based on its country code; some of the larger countries are divided into several MDAs, while separate MDAs exist for sections of ocean and common aeronautic routes.

Pagers are assigned with telephone numbers in area code 480 and can also be contacted using email, SMS and the web-based interface used to send messages to Iridium phones.

Two-way satellite messengers 
In 2017, Garmin announced inReach SE+ and inReach Explorer+ satellite communicators, which use Iridium satellite network for global coverage. Garmin inReach mini, a satellite messenger with more compact dimensions, was announced a year later. These devices can send and receive text messages with any cell phone number, email address or another inReach device, as well as to provide location sharing, navigation and direct communication options to emergency services.

ZOLEO satellite communicator is a satellite communication device which uses Bluetooth connection to provide two-way messaging to connected smartphone or tablet devices via global Iridium network when cellular or Wi-Fi coverage is unavailable.

Other satellite phones 
Several other Iridium-based telephones exist, such as payphones, and equipment intended for installation on ships and aircraft. The DPL handset made by NAL Research combined with a 9522 transceiver is used for some of these products. This handset provides a user interface nearly identical to that of the 9505 series phones.

Standalone transceiver units 
These can be used for data-logging applications in remote areas (as in data collection satellites). Some types of buoys, such as those used for the tsunami warning system, use Iridium satellites to communicate with their base. The remote device is programmed to call or send short burst data (SBD) messages to the base at specified intervals, or it can be set to accept calls in order for it to offload its collected data.

The following transceivers have been released over the years:

Iridium Core 9523 – Similar to the 9522B, a modular transceiver released in 2012, designed to be an embedded solution.
Iridium 9522B – A transceiver released in late 2008, is smaller than the 9522A and has similar features. It also supports Circuit-Switched Data (CSD), not just SBD.
Iridium 9522A – Based on the 9522, some variants have built in GPS and autonomous reporting functions. Supports SBD.
Motorola 9522 – Last Motorola transceiver, supports outgoing SMS but no SBD.
Motorola 9520 – Original transceiver module, does not support outgoing SMS or SBD. Designed for use in vehicles with accompanying handset

Short burst data modems 
These devices support only SBD for Internet of things (IoT) services and do not use a SIM card.

Iridium 9601 – Supports only SBD, several tracking devices and other products have been built around this modem. It was an Iridium manufactured product designed as an OEM module for integration into applications that only use the Iridium Short Burst Data Service. Short Burst Data applications are supported through an RS-232 interface. Examples of these applications include maritime vessel tracking or automatic vehicle tracking.
Iridium 9602 – Smaller, cheaper version of 9601 (released in 2010).
Iridium 9603 – One-fourth the volume and half the footprint of 9602

Iridium OpenPort 
Iridium OpenPort is a broadband satellite voice and data communications system for maritime vessels. The system is used for crew calling and e-mail services on sea vessels such as merchant fleets, government and navy vessels, fishing fleets and personal yachts.

Iridium operates at only 2.2 to 3.8 kbit/s, which requires very aggressive voice compression and decompression algorithms. (By comparison, AMR used in 3G phones requires a minimum of 4.75 kbit/s, G.729 requires 6.4 kbit/s, and iLBC requires 13.33 kbit/s.) Latency for data connections averages 1800 ms round-trip, with a mode of 1300 to 1400 ms and a minimum around 980 ms. Latency is highly variable depending on the path data takes through the satellite constellation as well the need for retransmissions due to errors, which may be around 2 to 3% for mobile originated packets under good conditions.

Iridium Certus 
One of the Iridium NEXT services is Iridium Certus, a globally available satellite broadband which is capable of up to 704 Kbps of bandwidth across maritime, aviation, land mobile, government, and IoT applications. Terminals for the service are provided by Cobham, Intellian Technologies and Thales.

Partnership with Qualcomm 
In 2023, Qualcomm and Iridium an announced agreement to bring two-way satellite messaging service to Android smartphones. The service, called Snapdragon Satellite, will be supported starting with devices that feature Snapdragon 8 Gen 2 chipsets, which are expected to launch in the second half of 2023. The solution for smartphones utilizes Iridium's L Band spectrum for downlink and uplink. Qualcomm stated that other devices, such as laptops, tablets, cars, and IoT products, may get Qualcomm Satellite service in the future. Garmin will collaborate with Qualcomm "to expand their satellite emergency response services to millions of new smartphone users globally".

See also 

 Mobile-satellite service
 Broadband Global Area Network
 DeLorme
 Globalsat Group
 Globalstar
 Gonets
 Inmarsat
 OneWeb
 O3b Networks
 SES Broadband
 Sky and Space Global
 Starlink (SpaceX)
 Thuraya
 Quake Global

References

External links 

 
 Application of Iridium telecommunications to oceanographic and polar research
 Iridium Data Modem (PDF)
 Technical success and economic failure (PDF), MIT

 
Companies that filed for Chapter 11 bankruptcy in 1999
2009 initial public offerings
Satellite telephony
Companies based in McLean, Virginia
Communications satellite operators
Mobile phone companies of the United States
Companies listed on the Nasdaq
Satellite Internet access
Data collection satellites